Wily is a text editor created by Gary Capell for the X Window System. It is based on Acme, the mouse-centric editing environment for the Plan 9 operating system. 

Wily is one of the few editors that supports mouse chording. Unlike Acme, it does not support mouse scrolls and its interface is black and white. Development and usage of Wily has been deprecated in favour of the port of Acme to Unix systems as part of Plan 9 from User Space.

See also
 Whiley
 Wile E. Coyote and Road Runner, cartoon characters, the first of whose names sounds similar to "Wily"
 Wiley (disambiguation)
 Willey (disambiguation)
 Wily (disambiguation)
 Wyle (disambiguation)
 Wylie (disambiguation)
 Wyllie
 Wyly
 Wylye (disambiguation)

External links 

 Wily Homepage
 Comparison with other editors in The Art of Unix Programming
 Gary Capell

Unix text editors
X Window programs
Software using the BSD license